Henri Alméras (1892 – 1965) was a French perfumer, author, and painter.

Early life and career
Alméras was born in a garrison in Brittany, the son of an officer. In school, he excelled in chemistry. He performed his military service in 1913 and was sent to war the following year. While fighting on the Macedonian front, he first met the couturier Jean Patou. Upon returning to France, he worked briefly at the physics laboratory at Dunlop, before answering an advertisement in Le Journal to join Antoine Chiris in Grasse. There he trained as a perfumer for four years alongside Ernest Beaux and Vincent Roubert. He left for Germany, working at a manufactory in the Ruhr, but soon returned to France. He was employed as a perfumer by Paul Poiret at the couturier's Parfums de Rosine as of 1923, though certain sources suggest he had worked there since 1914. In 1925, he left Rosine for the Parfums d’Orsay, working with Henri Robert, though quit soon after. He was subsequently hired by Jean Patou, where he remained until 1933. He left to work for Fragonard and several other houses. In 1948, he published his comic novella La grand’soif du trompette Bidard (The Grea’Thirst of the Trumpeter Bidard), inspired by his military service, under the pseudonym Henri de Vérac. In the late 1940s, he managed the Parfums de Luzy. He also served as an advisor at Fabergé.

Perfumes created for Jean Patou

1925 – Amour Amour 
 a floral fragrance and part of a trilogy of perfumes  with Que Sais-Je? and Adieu Sagesse. Amour Amour represents the initial rush of romantic love.
1925 – Que Sais-Je?
 represents the hesitation one feels before acting on romantic feelings. Que sais je? is a fruity fragrance with notes of peach, apricot, orange flower, jasmine, and rose.
1925 – Adieu Sagesse
represents the moment when one surrenders to passion. Adieu Sagesse is a floral fragrance with notes of neroli, lily-of-the-valley, carnation, tuberose, and opopanax. It has a base of musk and civet.
 1927 – Chaldée
inspired by Patou's Huile de Chaldée, the first ever suntan lotion. The fragrance celebrates the new fashion for suntanning that arose in the 1920s. The name is a reference to Chaldea, and the fragrance is a dry blend of spices, amber, and opopanax.
 1928 – Le Sien  
this was the first of the fresh, clean, sporty type of perfumes and was promoted as a unisex fragrance for men and women. In 1929, Jean Patou advertised the chypre and leather fragrance, as “a masculine perfume for the outdoors woman” who “plays golf, smokes and drives a car at 120 kilometers an hour.” It is classified as a citrus chypre fragrance for men and women. Top notes: bergamot. Middle notes: lavender, fern. Base notes: leather, oakmoss, Bourbon vetiver, Mysore sandalwood, tonka, amber, musk, labdanum.
 1929 – Moment Suprême
a spicy amber fragrance with notes of geranium, clove, bergamot, rose and jasmine.
 1929 – Joy 
Released at the beginning of the Great Depression, Joy is Jean Patou's most famous fragrance. When it came out, it was marketed as the "costliest perfume in the world." Joy is a classic example of the floral perfume genre, and it is known for its notes of Bulgarian rose and French jasmine.
 1933 – Divine Folie 
an amber floral fragrance with notes of orange flower, ylang-ylang, neroli, iris, vetiver, jasmine, rose, musk and vanilla.
 1935 –  Normandie  
released to celebrate the launch of the luxury French ocean liner of the same name, Normandie is a chypre fragrance with wood and fruit notes.
 1936 – Vacances  
released to celebrate the first paid holidays in France, Vacances is a fresh floral fragrance with notes of hawthorn, galbanum, hyacinth, lilac and mimosa.
 1938 – Colony  
a fruity chypre with a prominent note of pineapple, Colony was inspired by the warm climate of tropical islands.

Louis Süe designed all bottles and boxes for the Patou's perfumes.

All of these perfumes are preserved in the archives of the Osmothèque, where they are accessible to the public.

References

External links
 Henri Alméras at fragrantica.com

French perfumers
1965 deaths
1892 births